Atanas Hristov Mihaylov (5 July 1949 – 1 October 2006) was an association football former forward and manager. Mihаylov is the top scorer in the history of the Bulgaria U21 team, managing 31 goals in 46 appearances. He played 45 games for the Bulgaria national football team, scored 23 goals, and won a silver medal at the 1968 Summer Olympics; he also played at the 1974 World Cup. Most of Mihaylov's club career was spent with Lokomotiv Sofia, but he also played for two years in Cyprus for Nea Salamina. He won the top Bulgarian league on two occasions. Mihaylov was known for his skills from set pieces, including scoring from corners.

Honours

Player
 Lokomotiv Sofia
 Bulgarian League: 1978

References

Vivliography

1949 births
2006 deaths
Bulgarian footballers
Bulgarian football managers
FC Lokomotiv 1929 Sofia players
Bulgaria international footballers
1974 FIFA World Cup players
Olympic footballers of Bulgaria
Footballers at the 1968 Summer Olympics
Olympic silver medalists for Bulgaria
Nea Salamis Famagusta FC players
Bulgarian expatriate footballers
Expatriate footballers in Cyprus
Bulgarian expatriate sportspeople in Cyprus
First Professional Football League (Bulgaria) players
Cypriot First Division players
Olympic medalists in football
FC Lokomotiv 1929 Sofia managers
Medalists at the 1968 Summer Olympics
Association football forwards
Footballers from Sofia